Estêvão da Gama may refer to:
Estêvão da Gama (15th century), father of Vasco da Gama
Estêvão da Gama (16th century), son of Vasco da Gama
Estêvão da Gama (c. 1470), cousin of Vasco da Gama

See also
Da Gama (disambiguation)
Gama (disambiguation)